Primary Times is a free family magazine which is distributed to schools in the United Kingdom and Ireland. The magazine was started in 1989 and aims to inform parents and carers of primary school age children about current forthcoming events, courses and attractions, and community activities. 
.
It's published as 61 separate magazines in the UK and Ireland, with a combined distribution of 2.7 million copies per issue. 

It is published once every term before each major school holiday plus a "back to school" issue in the autumn, and contains competitions, games and listings of local events.

The magazines do not carry any advertising considered to be offensive to young families or harmful to the best interests of young children. A magazine App for iOS devices is available in Apple's App Store.

In 2020 Primary Times was named as the Best Primary Education Publication by Irish Enterprise Awards.

References

External links
Primary Times website

Children's magazines published in the United Kingdom
Education magazines
Free magazines
Lifestyle magazines published in the United Kingdom
Magazines established in 1989
Magazines published in Ireland
Parenting magazines